David James Bellamy  (18 January 1933 – 11 December 2019) was an English botanist, television presenter, author and environmental campaigner.

Early and personal life

Bellamy was born in London to parents Winifred May (née Green) and Thomas Bellamy on 18 January 1933. He was raised in a Baptist family and retained a strong Christian faith throughout his life. As a child, he had hoped to be a ballet dancer, but he concluded that his rather large physique regrettably precluded him from pursuing the training.

Bellamy went to school in south London, attending Chatsworth Road Primary School in Cheam, Cheam Road Junior School, and Sutton County Grammar School, where he initially showed an aptitude for English literature and history; he then found his vocation because of an inspirational science teacher, studying zoology, botany, physics, and chemistry in the sixth form. He gained an honours degree in botany at Chelsea College of Science and Technology (now part of King's College London) in 1957 and a doctor of philosophy at Bedford College in 1960.

Bellamy was influenced by Gene Stratton-Porter's 1909 novel A Girl of the Limberlost and Disney's 1940 film Fantasia.

Bellamy married Rosemary Froy in 1959, and the couple remained together until her death in 2018. They had five children: Henrietta (died 2017), Eoghain, Brighid, Rufus, and Hannah. Bellamy lived with Rosemary in the Pennines, in County Durham.

Scientific career

Bellamy's first work in a scientific environment was as a laboratory assistant at Ewell Technical College before he studied for his Bachelor of Science at Chelsea.
In 1960 he became a lecturer in the botany department of Durham University.
The work that brought him to public prominence was his environmental consultancy on the Torrey Canyon oil spill in 1967, about which he wrote a paper in the leading scientific journal, Nature.

Publishing career and related

Bellamy published many scientific papers and books between 1966 and 1986 (see #Bibliography). Many books were associated with the TV series on which he worked. During the 1980s, he replaced Big Chief I-Spy as the figurehead of the I-Spy range of children's books, to whom completed books were sent to get a reward. In 1980, he released a single written by Mike Croft with musical arrangement by Dave Grosse to coincide with the release of the I-Spy title I Spy Dinosaurs (about dinosaur fossils) entitled "Brontosaurus Will You Wait For Me?" (backed with "Oh Stegosaurus"). He performed it on Blue Peter wearing an orange jump suit. It reached number 88 in the charts.

Promotional and conservation work
In the early 1970s, Bellamy helped to establish Durham Wildlife Trust, and remained a key player in the conservation movement in the Durham area for a number of decades.

The New Zealand Tourism Department, a government agency, became involved with the Coast to Coast adventure race in 1988 as they recognised the potential for event tourism. They organised and funded foreign journalists to come and cover the event. One of those was Bellamy, who did not just report from the event, but decided to compete. While in the country, Bellamy worked on a documentary series Moa's Ark that was released by Television New Zealand in 1990, and he was awarded the New Zealand 1990 Commemoration Medal.

Bellamy was the originator, along with David Shreeve and the Conservation Foundation (which he also founded), of the Ford European Conservation Awards.

In 2002, he was a keynote speaker on conservation issues at the Asia Pacific Ecotourism Conference.

In 2015, David Bellamy and his wife Rosemary visited Malaysia to explore its wildlife.

In 2016, he opened the Hedleyhope Fell Boardwalk, which is the main feature of Durham Wildlife Trust's Hedleyhope Fell reserve in County Durham. The project includes a 60-metre path from Tow Law to the Hedleyhope Fell reserve, and 150 metres of boardwalk made from recycled plastic bottles.

Broadcasting career

After Bellamy’s TV appearances concerning the Torrey Canyon disaster, his exuberant and demonstrative presentation of science topics featured on programmes such as Don't Ask Me along with other scientific personalities such as Magnus Pyke, Miriam Stoppard, and Rob Buckman. He wrote, appeared in, or presented hundreds of television programmes on botany, ecology, environmentalism, and other issues. His television series included Bellamy on Botany, Bellamy's Britain, Bellamy's Europe and Bellamy's Backyard Safari. He was regularly parodied by impersonators such as Lenny Henry on Tiswas with a "gwapple me gwapenuts" catchphrase. His distinctive voice was used in advertising.

Activism 

In 1983, Bellamy was imprisoned for blockading the Australian Franklin River in a protest against a proposed dam. On 18 August 1984, he leapt from the pier at St Abbs Harbour into the North Sea; in the process, he officially opened Britain's first Voluntary Marine Reserve, the St. Abbs and Eyemouth Voluntary Marine Reserve.  In the late 1980s, he fronted a campaign in Jersey, Channel Islands, to save Queens Valley, the site of the lead character's cottage in Bergerac, from being turned into a reservoir because of the presence of a rare type of snail, but was unable to stop it.

In 1997, he stood unsuccessfully at Huntingdon against the incumbent Prime Minister John Major for the Referendum Party. Bellamy credited this campaign with the decline in his career as a popular celebrity and television personality. In a 2002 interview, he said it was ill-advised.

He was a prominent campaigner against the construction of wind farms in undeveloped areas, despite appearing very enthusiastic about wind power in the educational video Power from the Wind produced by Britain's Central Electricity Generating Board.

David Bellamy was the president of the British Institute of Cleaning Science, and was a strong supporter of its plan to educate young people to care for and protect the environment. The David Bellamy Awards Programme is a competition designed to encourage schools to be aware of, and act positively towards, environmental cleanliness. Bellamy was also a patron of the British Homeopathic Association, and the UK plastic recycling charity Recoup from 1998.

Views on global warming

In Bellamy’s foreword to the 1989 book The Greenhouse Effect, he wrote:

The profligate demands of humankind are causing far-reaching changes to the atmosphere of planet Earth, of this there is no doubt. Earth's temperature is showing an upward swing, the so-called greenhouse effect, now a subject of international concern. The greenhouse effect may melt the glaciers and ice caps of the world, causing the sea to rise and flood many of our great cities and much of our best farmland.

Bellamy's later statements on global warming indicate that he subsequently changed his views.  A letter he published on 16 April 2005 in New Scientist asserted that a large proportion (555 of 625) of the glaciers being observed by the World Glacier Monitoring Service were advancing, not retreating. George Monbiot of The Guardian tracked down Bellamy's original source for this information and found that it was from discredited data originally published by Fred Singer, who claimed to have obtained these figures from a 1989 article in the journal Science; however, Monbiot proved that this article had never existed. Bellamy subsequently accepted that his figures on glaciers were wrong, and announced in a letter to The Sunday Times in 2005 that he had "decided to draw back from the debate on global warming", although Bellamy jointly authored a paper with Jack Barrett in the refereed Civil Engineering journal of the Institution of Civil Engineers, entitled "Climate stability: an inconvenient proof" in May 2007.

In 2008 Bellamy signed the Manhattan Declaration, calling for the immediate halt to any tax-funded attempts to counteract climate change. He maintained a view that man-made climate change is "poppycock", insisting that climate change is part of a natural cycle.

His opinions changed the way some organisations viewed Bellamy. The Royal Society of Wildlife Trusts stated in 2005, "We are not happy with his line on climate change", and Bellamy, who had been president of the Wildlife Trusts since 1995, was succeeded by Aubrey Manning in November 2005.  Bellamy asserted that his views on global warming resulted in the rejection of programme ideas by the BBC.

Bibliography

Bellamy wrote at least 45 books:

Bellamy on Botany (1972)  
Peatlands (1973)
Bellamy's Britain (1974)
Life Giving Sea (1975)
Green Worlds (1975)
The World of Plants (1975)
It's Life (1976)
Bellamy's Europe (1976)
Natural History of Teesdale Chapter 7 Conservation & Upper Teesdale' (1976)
Botanic Action (1978)
Botanic Man (1978)
Half of Paradise (1978)
Forces of Life (1979)
Bellamy's Backyard Safari (1981)
The Great Seasons (with Sheila Mackie, illustrator; Hodder & Stoughton, 1981)
Il Libro Verde (1981)
The Mouse Book (1983)
Bellamy's New World (1983)
The Queen's Hidden Garden (1984)
I Spy (1985)
Bellamy's Bugle (1986)
Bellamy's Ireland (1986)
Turning The Tide (1986)
Bellamy's Changing Countryside (1987)
England's Last Wilderness (1989)
England's Lost Wilderness (1990)
Wilderness Britain? (1990, Oxford Illustrated Press)
Moa's Ark (with Brian Springett and Peter Hayden, 1990)
How Green Are You? (1991)
Tomorrow's Earth (1991)
World Medicine: Plants, Patients and People (1992)
Blooming Bellamy (1993)
Trees of the World (1993)
The Bellamy Herbal (2003)
Fabric Live: Bellamy Sessions (2004)
Jolly Green Giant (autobiography, 2002, Century)
A Natural Life (autobiography, 2002, Arrow)
Conflicts in the Countryside: The New Battle for Britain (2005), Shaw & Sons,

Discovering the Countryside with David Bellamy

Bellamy was "consultant editor and contributor" for this series, published by Hamlyn in conjunction with the Royal Society for Nature Conservation:
Coastal Walks (1982)
Woodland Walks (1982)
Waterside Walks (1983)
Grassland Walks (1983)

Forewords

Bellamy contributed forewords or introductions to:
  It's Funny About the Trees a collection of light verse by Paul Wigmore [Autolycus Press],  (1998)
   Hidden Nature" The Startling Insights of Viktor Schauberger by Alick Bartholomew (2003)
 Chris Packham's Back Garden Nature Reserve New Holland Publishers, Chris Packham, (2001) 
 The Cosmic Fairy Arthur Atkinson [pseudonym for Arthur Moppett] [Colin Smythe Limited Publishers], 1996, 
 British Naturalists Association Guide to Woodlands J L Cloudsley-Thompson
 While the Earth Endures Creation, Cosmology and Climate Change Philip Foster [St Matthew Publishing Ltd]. (2008)
 Marine Fish and Invertebrates of Northern Europe Frank Emil Moen & Erling Svensen [KOM Publishing].  (2004)
 "The Lost Australia of François Péron" Colin Wallace [Nottingham Court Press],  (1984)
 Populate and Perish?, R. Birrell, D. Hill and J. Nevill, eds., Fontana/Australian Conservation Foundation (1984),

Recognition

Bellamy also held these positions:

Patron of Recoup (Recycling of Used Plastics), the national charity for plastics recycling
Professor of Adult and Continuing Education, University of Durham
Hon. Prof. Central Queensland University, Faculty of Engineering and Physical Systems
Special Professor of Botany, (Geography), University of Nottingham
 Patron of the British Chelonia Group, For tortoise, terrapin and turtle care and conservation

President of:
The Wildlife Trusts partnership (1995-2005)
Wildlife Watch (1988-2005)
The Wildlife Trust for Birmingham and the Black Country
Durham Wildlife Trust
FOSUMS - Friends Of Sunderland Museums
The Conservation Foundation, UK
Population Concern
Plantlife
WATCH
Coral Cay Conservation
National Association for Environmental Education
British Naturalists' Association
Galapagos Conservation Trust
British Institute of Cleaning Science
Hampstead Heath Anglers Society
The Camping and Caravanning club
The Young People's Trust for the Environment.

Vice president of:

The Conservation Volunteers (TCV)
Fauna and Flora International
Marine Conservation Society
Australian Marine Conservation Society
Nature in Art Trust

Trustee, patron or honorary member of:

Patron of National Gamekeepers' Organisation
Living Landscape Trust
World Land Trust (1992–2002)
Patron of Southport Flower Show
Patron, The Space Theatre, Dundee
Hon Fellow Chartered Institution of Water and Environmental Management
Chairman of the international committee for the Tourism for Tomorrow Awards.
Patron of Butterfly World Project, St. Albans, UK
BSES Expeditions
 Patron, Project AWARE Foundation
Patron of Tree Appeal
Patron of RECOrd (Local Biological Records Centre for Cheshire)
Patron of Ted Ellis Trust

Honours and awards

Bellamy was awarded an Honorary Dr. of Science, degree from Bournemouth University.  He was the recipient of a number of other awards:

The Dutch Order of the Golden Ark
the U.N.E.P. Global 500 Award
The Duke of Edinburgh's Prize (1969)
BAFTA, Richard Dimbleby Award
BSAC Diver of The Year Award
BSAC Colin McLeod Award, 2001
In 2013, Professor Chris Baines gave the inaugural David Bellamy Lecture at Buckingham Palace to honour Bellamy's 80th birthday. A second David Bellamy Lecture was given by Pete Wilkinson at the Royal Geographical Society in 2014.

Chronology of TV appearances and radio broadcasts

See also

 Environmental movement
 Environmentalism
 Individual and political action on climate change

References

External links
 Barrett Bellamy Climate climate science web site of Drs. David Bellamy and Jack Barrett
 David Bellamy Awards for Sustainability in Schools
David Bellamy Conservation Awards
Simon Hattenstone, The Guardian, 30 September 2002, "The green man" – Interview with David Bellamy
New Scientist: 11 June 2005, British conservationist to lose posts after climate claims – Issue 2503, page 4
Correspondence between David Bellamy and George Monbiot, 2004
George Monbiot, The Guardian, 10 May 2005, "Junk science:David Bellamy's inaccurate and selective figures on glacier shrinkage are a boon to climate change deniers"
Radio broadcast, Bellamy, David Suzuki, Janet Earle on marine conservation, RRR 102.7fm, Melbourne, 2002
St. Abbs and Eyemouth Voluntary Marine Reserve,  Britain's first Voluntary Marine Reserve opened by David Bellamy in August 1984.
Today's forecast: yet another blast of hot air, The Times, 22 October 2007.
Channel 4 Newsnight interview with David Bellamy and George Monbiot

1933 births
2019 deaths
English botanists
English environmentalists
English expatriates in Australia
English non-fiction writers
English television presenters
English Baptists
Officers of the Order of the British Empire
Writers from London
Alumni of King's College London
Alumni of Bedford College, London
Academics of Durham University
Referendum Party politicians
People educated at Sutton Grammar School
People from County Durham
English conservationists
English male non-fiction writers
20th-century Baptists